The  is a Japanese international school in Mangilao, Guam. It includes both day school and weekend supplementary school divisions, and the school also holds Japanese language classes. As of April 2013 Toyohito Yoneyama is the chairperson of the school.

History
Prior to the establishment of the day school, Japanese children in Guam attended a special supplementary Japanese school. The Guam Japanese Association began considering making one in March 1972 and it opened by May 1973. It occupied the conference room of the Japan Airlines office at Guam Airport, then St. John's School beginning in September 1975, then to the Fujita Hotel beginning in September 1979, then six classrooms in Tamuning Elementary School beginning in July 1987.

Around the years 1987-1989 there was a committee held to establish a Japanese day school in Guam. The day school opened in April 1989 as the Agana Japanese School (アガナ日本人学校 Agana Nihonjin Gakkō). Originally its campus was the Pacific Islands Club (PIC) Hotel in Tamuning, near Hagåtña (Agana), which now housed both day and weekend schools. In April 1990 the permanent campus in Mangilao opened. The dedication occurred the previous March. The building, with 10 classrooms, had a total cost of $2,000,000.

The school received its current name on March 17, 1999 (Heisei 11).

See also

 American School in Japan, American international school in Tokyo

References

Further reading

  - Profile - Shibano's name is written in Japanese as 芝野 淳一.
  - See profile at CiNii. English Abstract Available.
 馬渕 豊 (前グアム日本人学校:静岡県浜松市立神久呂小学校). "グアム日本人学校における言語の教育(教科指導) ." 在外教育施設における指導実践記録 33, 59-62, 2010-12-24. Tokyo Gakugei University. See profile at CiNii.
 小平 孝昌 (栃木県小山市立大谷東小学校・グァム日本人学校(前)). "グアム日本人学校における総合的な学習の実践(第3章総合的な学習)." 在外教育施設における指導実践記録 28, 36-39, 2005. Tokyo Gakugei University. See profile at CiNii.

External links
  Japanese School of Guam - Full day and weekend school page
 Japanese School of Guam (English site) at Google Sites
  
  
  
  Japanese School of Guam at the Japan Club of Guam (グアム日本人会 Guamu Nihonjinkai)
   at the Japan Club of Guam 
  Japan Club of Guam

1989 establishments in Guam
Educational institutions established in 1989
Guam
Guam
Guam
Schools in Guam
Japanese international schools in Oceania
Private K–8 schools in the United States